The Medal of Pushkin is a state decoration of the Russian Federation awarded to its citizens and to foreigners for achievements in the arts and culture, education, humanities and literature.  It is named in honour of Russian author and poet Alexander Sergeyevich Pushkin.

History 
The Medal of Pushkin was established on May 9, 1999 by Presidential Decree № 574, its statute was amended on September 7, 2010 by Presidential Decree № 1099 which completely revamped the awards and honours system of the Russian Federation.

Award statute 
The Medal of Pushkin is awarded to citizens of the Russian Federation with at least 20 years in socio-humanitarian activities for achievements in the arts and culture, education, humanities and literature, for great contributions to the study and preservation of the Russian cultural heritage, in the rapprochement and mutual enrichment of cultures of nations and peoples, for the creation of highly artistic images.

The Russian Federation order of precedence dictates the medal is to be worn on the left breast with other medals immediately after the Medal of Nesterov.

Award description 
The Medal of Pushkin is a circular 32mm diameter silver medal with raised rims on both the obverse and reverse.  The obverse bears a self-portrait (line drawing) of Pushkin's left profile.  On the reverse center the horizontal relief signature of Pushkin himself.  The signature takes most of the total width of the medal.  Under the signature near the lower rim of the medal, the letter "N" in relief and a line reserved for the award serial number.

The medal hangs from a standard Russian pentagonal mount by a ring through the medal suspension loop.  The mount is covered by an overlapping 24mm wide azure silk moiré ribbon with a 2.5mm golden stripe situated 5mm from the ribbon's right edge.

Award recipients 
Number of awards of the Medal of Pushkin to 2012:

 
 Natalia Y. Borodin, director of the Pushkin school in Novomoskovsk, Tula Region, received two Medals of Pushkin - 1999 and 2000.
The Medal of Pushkin was also awarded to citizens of the following states: Abkhazia, Afghanistan, Argentina, Armenia, Australia, Austria, Azerbaijan, Belarus, Belgium,  Bolivia, Bosnia and Herzegovina, Brazil, Bulgaria, Cameroon, Canada, Chile, China, Croatia, Cuba, Cyprus, Czech Republic, Ecuador, Egypt, Eritrea, Estonia, Finland, France, Georgia, Germany, Ghana, Greece, Guatemala, Guyana, Hungary, India, Ireland, Israel, Italy, Japan, Kazakhstan, South Korea, Kyrgyzstan, Latvia, Liechtenstein, Lithuania, Macedonia, Mali, Malta, Mexico, Moldova, Mongolia, Montenegro, New Zealand, Nicaragua, Nigeria, South Ossetia, Panama, Paraguay, Peru, Philippines, Poland, Romania, Serbia, Seychelles, Singapore, Slovakia, Spain, Syria, Sweden, Switzerland, Tajikistan, Turkey, Turkmenistan, Ukraine, United Kingdom, Uruguay, Uzbekistan, USA, and Vietnam.
 Many heads of state were also awarded the Medal of Pushkin.

A medal awarded to Ian Blatchford in 2015, and personally presented by Vladimir Putin, was returned in March 2022, in response to the Russian invasion of Ukraine.

See also
Awards and decorations of the Russian Federation

References

External links
The Commission on State Awards to the President of the Russian Federation

Orders, decorations, and medals of Russia
Civil awards and decorations of Russia
Russian awards
Awards established in 1999
1999 establishments in Russia